John Baptist Nambeshe (born November 24, 1965) is a Ugandan politician and a member of the 11th Ugandan Parliament from Manjiya County in Bududa district currently serving as the Chief Whip of the opposition in Parliament. He is a member of the opposition National Unity Platform (NUP) and Deputy President of the party, Eastern Region.

Early life and education 
Nambeshe was born in Manjiya County, Bududa District. He attended Shikhuyu Primary School where he earned his First School Leaving Certificate in 1982 before obtaining his A’Level from Bulucheke SS (1986) and A’Level from Nabumali High School in 1989. He earned a diploma in Local Government and Human Rights from Uganda Martyrs University in 2011 and a bachelor’s degree in Arts in 2014. Nambeshe worked as a teacher at Bududa SS from 1989 to 1990, and laboratory technician for Jinja College between from 1993 to 1999.

Political career 
Nambeshe ventured into politics in 2006 when he contested and was elected as LC3 Chairperson of Bududa Town Council in 2006. In 2011, he was elected as LC5 Chairperson of Bududa District Local Government. In 2016, he was elected to the parliament of Uganda on the ticket of National Resistance Movement and served on the national economy and natural resources committees in the Parliament. He was one of the NRM members of parliament who opposed removal of age limit for president in 2017 in defiance of the party’s instruction to support the removal of age limit to enable President Yoweri Museveni to continue in office. He was criticised by the party official. He left NRM to join the newly created NUP party where he was appointed Deputy President of the party, Eastern Region and served as the party’s acting National President for three weeks in 2020 when Robert Kyagulanyi Ssentamu the president travelled United States for official engagement. Nambeshe contested and won the parliamentary seat for Manjiya County in Bududa district on the ticket of NUP in the 2021 general election. He was elected Chip Whip of the opposition following his party’s emergence as the major opposition party in the 11th parliament.

References 

Living people
1965 births
Members of the Parliament of Uganda
National Unity Platform politicians
National Resistance Movement politicians
Uganda Martyrs University alumni
21st-century Ugandan politicians
People from Bududa District